The IEEE Pioneer Award in Nanotechnology is given by the Institute of Electrical and Electronics Engineers  Nanotechnology Council for research in nanotechnology.

The main considerations for judging include distinction in long-term technical achievements, leadership, innovation, breadth, and impact on nanotechnology and engineering, recognizing individuals whose technical achievements go beyond the borders of a particular technical society.  Nominees must be at least 10 years beyond their terminal degree. One or two Pioneer Awards are given each year; when two are awarded, there may be one for academics, and one for industry or government. The award consists of honorarium and a commemorative plaque.

Recipients

See also
 Kavli Prize in Nanoscience
 Foresight Institute Feynman Prize in Nanotechnology
 ISNSCE Nanoscience Award

References

External links 
 The Institute for Electrical and Electronics Engineers (IEEE)
 IEEE Nanotechnology Council

Academic awards
IEEE society and council awards